The athletics competition at the 1997 European Youth Summer Olympic Days was held from 20 to 23 July. The events took place in Lisbon, Portugal. Boys and girls born 1980 or 1981 or later participated 29 track and field events, divided equally between the sexes with the exception of 3000 metres, 2000 metres steeplechase and pole vault for boys but not girls.

Medal summary

Men

Women

References

Results
1997 European Youth Olympics. World Junior Athletics History. Retrieved on 2014-11-25.
European Youth Olympics. GBR Athletics. Retrieved on 2014-11-25.

1997 European Youth Summer Olympic Days
European Youth Summer Olympic Days
1997
International athletics competitions hosted by Portugal